White Birch is a future neighbourhood in west Edmonton, Alberta, Canada. It is located within the Riverview area of Edmonton and was originally considered Riverview Neighbourhood 5 within the Riverview Area Structure Plan (ASP).

White Birch is bounded on the north by Grandisle, east by the North Saskatchewan River valley, and south and west by Parkland County.

Surrounding neighbourhoods

References 

Neighbourhoods in Edmonton